Stacy Amanda Rowles (September 11, 1955 in Los Angeles – October 30, 2009 in Burbank, California) was an American jazz trumpeter, flugelhornist, and vocalist. She was the daughter of Jimmy Rowles.

Rowles learned piano and percussion in her youth before settling on trumpet, which she studied with Charlie Shoemake. She played alongside her father at the 1973 Monterey Jazz Festival and played with Clark Terry's all-female big band in 1975. She later worked with Ann Patterson's Maiden Voyage, Diana Krall, Red Holloway, Swinging Ladies, Jack Van Poll, and others.

References
Thomas Owens, "Stacy Rowles". The New Grove Dictionary of Jazz. 2nd edition, ed. Barry Kernfeld, 2004.

American jazz trumpeters
American jazz flugelhornists
American jazz singers
Musicians from Los Angeles
1955 births
2009 deaths
20th-century American singers
20th-century trumpeters
Jazz musicians from California
20th-century American women singers
Women trumpeters
21st-century American women